Craig Robert Fong is an Australian actor.

Early life and education
Fong was born in Carnarvon, Western Australia and grew up in a fairly isolated outback environment. At the age of 15 he moved to Perth to continue his studies at Rossmoyne Senior High School. As there were no drama classes at the school, he studied photography, with the intention of eventually becoming a film director.

After high school, Fong enrolled at the Central Institute of Technology in Perth, majoring in film production and animation in a three-year course. During this time, he won an award for Best Television Commercial, and also made a short film which won the leading actor Matt Thompson Best Male Actor at the 1991 Film and Television Institute (FTI) Awards in Fremantle. In 1992 Fong's film was nominated for Best Documentary at the FTI Awards.

He was then cast in his first television commercial for Western Australian Tourism.

Career
Fong moved Sydney to pursue an acting career. He was an extra on Thank God He Met Lizzie and Hart to Hart Down Under, and was featured in a Crowded House music video, Instinct.

He then travelled to Singapore, where he did some fashion modelling, and then Malaysia. There he got a part in the Hollywood movie Entrapment, starring Catherine Zeta-Jones and Sean Connery.

In 1999 Fong was cast in his first lead role in an independent film Spinning Gasing portraying Harry, a young musician who is caught between culture, religion and love.

Fong returned to Singapore for two years, to work in telemovies with longtime friend and director Kabir Bhatia, in the films On the Wings of Butterflies (playing a Japanese soldier who falls in love with a local Chinese Singaporean girl during World War II), and Full Circle.

Returning to Perth, Fong met playwright John Aitken, and was cast in various roles on stage. For his role as a doppelgänger in Lost is my Quiet, he was awarded Best Supporting Actor at the 8th Annual Equity Guild Awards in October 2007, in Western Australia. Also in 2007, he played the character Bao Tang in the Australian crime thriller film, Without Warrant.

In June 2009, Fong was cast in the Malaysian epic feature film Hikayat Merong Mahawangsa (also known internationally as The Malay Chronicles: Bloodlines, and in the television series Wadi Unung, for Astro Prima. He then played  Japanese Lieutenant Tanaka. The Astro Citra miniseries, directed by Kabir Bhatia, based on the Japanese occupation of South-East Asia, particularly the Sandakan Death Marches.

He has acted many European films, including Liebe und Tod auf Java (Love and Death in Java), the German film about endangered orangutans Lost in Borneo, starring Hannes Jaenicke, Mirjam Weichselbraun and Patrick Heyn. 

Fong played Andy Chow in The Hong Kong Affair with German actress Veronica Ferres, who was also co-producer. 

In November 2011, Fong was nominated for Best Supporting Actor for The Malay Chronicles: Bloodlines at the Anugerah Skrin in Malaysia.

In 2013 Fong teamed up once again with writer and director Kabir Bhatia on Gila Baby and starred in the Malaysian drama film Cuak. In March 2013, he appeared in Das Traumschiff, one of Germany's long-running television series, filmed in and around Kuala Lumpur and Langkawi, playing the character Beto.

Fong played the role of Benny in  The Heights by Matchbox Pictures for ABC Television and the US NBC network.

In January 2020, filming began for the feature film Talbis Iblis (The Devil's Deception), directed by Kabir Bhatia.

Fong had a role in the 2022 Australian series, Mystery Road: Origin, directed by Dylan River and starring Mark Coles Smith for Bunya Productions.

Filmography

Film

Television

Publications

References

External links
 
 
 Stephen dari Hang Tuah ke Merong Mahawangsa 9 June 2009
 "Fong wings it" The Sunday Times, 18 September 2005
 "The Cultivation Of Craig Fong" 5 January 2012

1970 births
Living people
Australian people of Chinese descent
Australian male film actors
Australian male television actors
Male actors from Western Australia
20th-century Australian male actors
21st-century Australian male actors
People from Carnarvon, Western Australia